Nidigattu Sanjay (born 19 March 1967), better known as N. Sanjay, is a Silver jubilee 1996-batch Regular Recruit (RR) Indian Police Service Officer belonging to Andhra Pradesh cadre.  He has a good record in police force.  Since 2017, he has been Director of Andhra Pradesh Police Academy in Anantapur, until it was moved to Mangalagiri.  On 27 January 2021, he was promoted to the rank of Additional Director General of Police.<ref>[https://www.witnessinthecorridors.com/BureaDetails.aspx?id=23119 Witness in the Corridors, 27 January 2021]</ref>

Recently, the Policeman was assigned a very sensitive role of Special Officer to monitor 2021 Andhra Pradesh local elections.  He was appointed by State Election Commissioner, N. Ramesh Kumar, IAS. His brief included not only overseeing security arrangements for elections, and also apprising State Election Commission on efforts to contain malpractices. The election exercise, which was held over four phases in February 2021, with a mechanism to receive and redress complaints.  Along with Ramesh Kumar, Sanjay toured the state, initiating confidence-building measures among voters.

Education
After schooling and collegiate studies in Visakhapatnam and New Delhi, he took a diploma in mechanical engineering, Sanjay joined Visakhapatnam Steel Plant, where he worked for nearly 8 years. He also pursued a course in law from Andhra University, Waltair.  With his father's inspiration, he prepared for civil services.

In the late nineties, Sanjay got selected to Indian Police Service and was trained in Lal Bahadur Shastri National Academy of Administration, Mussorie and Sardar Vallabhbhai Patel National Police Academy, Shivarampally.  He was a Regular Recruit of 50th group of recruits at Police Academy, when it was under incumbency of Trinath Mishra, IPS.

Career
Pre-bifurcation
Sanjay served in different capacities in undivided Andhra Pradesh in districts of Warangal, Nalgonda, Kurnool, Ananthapur, Nizamabad and Hyderabad. In tackling crime, he faced Naxalism, Communalism and Factionalism and braved odds to rein in discipline.

In Hyderabad City, he served as Deputy Commissioner of Police (West Zone) during 2004 and was also Joint Commissioner of Police (Administration) in 2013. During Sanjay's tenure as DCP in Hyderabad in 2004, his jurisdiction (West Zone) witnessed a sensational case of crime that involved Tollywood film star Balakrishna.  There was also a shootout of a Leopard, that irked Animal rights Activists, which he reminiscences that it was rather necessitated due to force of circumstances. Sanjay also served in Organisation for Counter Terrorist Operations (OCTOPUS) in 2010.

Post-bifurcation
In 2014, during bifurcation of Andhra Pradesh, the Police Officer chose to remain in residual Andhra Pradesh. On his preference, he was retained in Andhra Pradesh cadre. Even after bifurcation, he continued to serve in Telangana as Joint managing director of Transmission Corporation of Andhra Pradesh until he was moved to Andhra Pradesh in early 2015 to serve as South Coastal Zone Guntur Range Inspector-general of police. During his two-year tenure as IGP, Sanjay continued to let the presence of Police known, to serve as a deterrent to those breaking the law.

In 2017, he was transferred as Director, Andhra Pradesh Police Academy, where he has been involved in overseeing training component of Policemen of State Police Services. During his first year in Ananthapur, there were 652 Stipendiary Cadet Trainee Sub-inspectors of Police of 2017 batch, out of which 165 were women, a record 25% of total candidates passing out of the college. In 2018, when Andhra Pradesh Police released a training manual on investigation in Human trafficking by then Director-General of police, R. P. Thakur in the presence of Social activist and Padma Shri awardee, Sunitha Krishnan, Sanjay was present and reaffirmed the commitment of Police force to include the manual in Syllabi'' of Police Training Colleges across the State.  With a spike in Cyber crimes and to better equip Police force, the Policeman conducted short-term courses among its Policemen on aspects to deal with it.

Under an E-governance project of National Crime Records Bureau under Government of India, Sanjay was made a Nodal Officer in 2019 for Andhra Pradesh to oversee Crime and Criminal Tracking Network and Systems.

References 

1967 births
Living people
People from Visakhapatnam
Telugu people
Indian Police Service officers
Andhra Pradesh Police
Andhra University alumni
Indian Baptists
Indian Christians
Convention of Baptist Churches of Northern Circars